Vilupanankurichi is a village in the Ariyalur taluk of Ariyalur district, Tamil Nadu, India.

Demographics 
 census, Vilupanankurichi had a total population of 2,584 with 1,286 males and 1,298 females.

References 

Villages in Ariyalur district